Skyward Express, is a private airline operating in Kenya. It serves local destinations, from its two operations bases at Wilson Airport for passengers and Jomo Kenyatta International Airport for cargo. Both airports are located in Nairobi, the Kenyan capital city.

Location
The airline maintains its headquarters at Wilson Airport, within Nairobi, Kenya's largest city and the country's capital.

The airline maintains a private building at Wilson Airport, for the exclusive use of Skyward Express staff and clients. The building is "equipped with a modern cafeteria", among other amenities.

History
Skyward Express was established in 2013, by two pilots; one of whom serves as the chairman of the airline, while the other serves as its managing director. Skyward Express inherited some equipment and some routes from the defunct Skyward International Aviation.

Overview
With the cessation of service by Skyward International Aviation, Skyward Express began commercial operations in 2013. Initially, the airline offered passenger charter and cargo service between Nairobi, Kenya, and destinations in neighboring Somalia. These services included the shipment of miraa from Nairobi to Somalia.

With the acquisition of more aircraft, the airline has expanded and diversified its passenger and cargo service to include more destinations and frequencies to oil-rich northwestern Kenyan counties and coastal tourist attractions.

Destinations
As of April 2021, Skyward  Express scheduled services to the following destinations:

Kenya
Nairobi: Wilson Airport (Passenger Hub)Jomo Kenyatta International Airport (Cargo Hub)
Eldoret: Eldoret International Airport
Lodwar: Lodwar Airport
Mombasa: Moi International Airport
Malindi: Malindi Airport
Lamu: Lamu Airport
Ukunda: Ukunda Airport
Kakamega: Kakamega Airstrip

Fleet
As of April 2021, Skyward Express maintained the following aircraft:

Accidents and incidents
 On July 21, 2021, a De Havilland Canada Dash 8-100 registered as 5Y-GRS crash-landed at El Wak, Kenya when its landing gear collapsed.

See also

 Airlines of Africa 
 List of airlines of Kenya

References

External links
 Official Website

Airlines established in 2013
Airlines of Kenya
Nairobi
2013 establishments in Kenya